Ladislav Gengel (born June 25, 1981) is a Czech professional ice hockey left winger for HC Příbram of the Czech 2. Liga.

Gengel played with 35 games in the Czech Extraliga for Vsetínská hokejová, BK Mladá Boleslav and Rytíři Kladno.

References

External links

1981 births
Living people
HC Berounští Medvědi players
Czech ice hockey left wingers
BK Havlíčkův Brod players
Stadion Hradec Králové players
LHK Jestřábi Prostějov players
Sportovní Klub Kadaň players
HC Kobra Praha players
HC Stadion Litoměřice players
BK Mladá Boleslav players
HC Most players
Rytíři Kladno players
HC Vrchlabí players
VHK Vsetín players